The Mount Ogden Via Ferrata hiking and climbing experience in Waterfall Canyon, is an outdoor recreation area located in Ogden City of Weber County, Utah. The privately owned climbing area is open for guided climbing tours only.

The mountainous site in Waterfall Canyon is known for its sheer rock walls, beautiful views of Weber County and the City of Ogden. It features a guided Via Ferrata climbing experience including a beginning training wall.

Rock climbing was once common there; climbers may now climb only if guided by approved climbing guides.

See also 
 Via Ferrata

References

External links
 Hit the Heights, but Take the Stairs. The New York Times. September 2006.
 OgdenFoothillPrivateLand, Facebook.com
 Up a Mountain With a Rifle. Shooting Illustrated. March 2011.
 Discover Via Ferrata. Experience Life.

Tourist attractions in Weber County, Utah
Tourist attractions in Utah
Hiking trails in Utah
Via ferrata